Digrammia irrorata is a moth of the family Geometridae first described by Alpheus Spring Packard in 1876. It is found in the western United States and south-western Canada (from Oklahoma to California, north to British Columbia and Alberta).

The wingspan is 23–26 mm. Adults are on wing from March to June in the northern part of the range. There are several generations in the south.

The larval food plant is unknown.

Subspecies
Digrammia irrorata irrorata
Digrammia irrorata rubricata Ferguson, 2008 (California)
Digrammia irrorata venosata (McDunnough, 1939)

External links

Macariini
Taxa named by Alpheus Spring Packard
Moths described in 1876